Francis William Monement (2 April 1858 – March 1943) was an English tennis player from Norfolk active in the late 19th century. He was a competitor at the 1880 Wimbledon Championship where he was defeated in the second round by Otway Woodhouse.

Career
William played his first tournament at the 1880 Wimbledon Championship losing to Otway Woodhouse in straight sets in the second round. In 1881 he won his first title at the Norwich Open against Edward Morgan Hansell. In 1882 he competed at the Prince's Club Championships at Hans Place, London were he lost to Ernest Renshaw in round one. he then won his second singles title at the Norwich Open against Edward Morgan Hansell. 

In 1883 he won his second Norwich Open title at Norwich defeating his brother William Bolding Monement in straight sets. In 1884 he won a third title at the Saxmundham LTC Tournament at Saxmundham against Maurice Welldon. In 1884 he won his fourth singles title at Rainthorpe Hall tournament against his brother. The same year he competed at the East of England Championships at Felixstowe where he won his fifth and final title against Maurice Welldon. In 1892 he played and won his final tournament and title at Baron's Hall, Fakenham, Norfolk.

Personal life
Francis William Monement was a landowner from King's Lynne in Norfolk, England. In 1925 he inherited the Weybourne Estate from his brother William Bolding Monement who was also an amateur tennis player. He died in 1943.

References

External links
Wimbledon Player Profile: F.W. Monement

1854 births
1943 deaths
19th-century English people
19th-century male tennis players
English male tennis players
British male tennis players
Tennis people from Norfolk